A crucifix is a cross with a representation of Jesus Christ, as used in Christian symbolism.

Crucifix may also refer to:

Arts
Crucifix (Cimabue, Arezzo), a large wooden crucifix dated to c. 1267-71
Crucifix (Cimabue, Santa Croce), distemper on wood painting dated to c. 1265
Crucifix (Michelangelo), a 1492 sculpture
Crucifix (Núñez Delgado), a 1599 sculpture
 Crucifix (band), an American hardcore punk band from Berkeley, California
 The Crucifix,  a 1934 film directed by G.B. Samuelson

Sports
 Crucifix (horse), a British Thoroughbred race horse
 Crucifix position, a grappling position that involves being perpendicularly behind the opponent 
 Iron cross, an extremely difficult gymnastic skill performed on rings (gymnastics)
 Chest fly, a strength training exercise; see Fly (exercise) 
 Crucifix neck crank, a grappling hold performed on a mounted opponent

Other
 Crucifix Hill, a World War II battle that took place on October 8, 1944, in Haarberg

